The Roman Catholic Diocese of Iquique is a diocese located in the city of Iquique, Chile, in the ecclesiastical province of Antofagasta.

History
 1880: Established as Apostolic Vicariate of Tarapacá from the Diocese of Arequipa in Peru
 20 December 1929: Promoted as Diocese of Iquique
 11 October 2018: Bishop emeritus Marco Antonio Órdenes Fernández was laicized by Pope Francis for sexual abuse of minors, a decision that cannot be appealed.

Bishops
 Vicars Apostolic of Tarapacá 
 Bishop Plácido Labarca Olivares (1887 – 1890.06.26), appointed Bishop of Concepción
 Bishop Guillermo Juan Carter Gallo (1895.06.12 – 1906.08.30)
 Bishop Martín Rucker Sotomayor (Apostolic Administrator 1906 – 1910)
 Bishop José María Caro Rodríguez (1911.05.06 – 1925.12.14), appointed Bishop of La Serena; future Cardinal 
 Bishop Carlos Labbé Márquez (1926.08.02 – 1929.12.20)

 Bishops of Iquique
 Bishop Carlos Labbé Márquez (1929.12.20 – 1941.06.30)
 Bishop Pedro Aguilera Narbona (1941.09.15 – 1966.11.21)
 Bishop José del Carmen Valle Gallardo (1966.11.21 – 1984.07.09)
 Bishop Francisco Javier Prado Aránguiz, SS.CC. (1984.07.09 – 1988.04.28), appointed Auxiliary Bishop of Valparaíso
 Bishop Enrique Troncoso Troncoso (1989.07.15 – 2000.05.28), appointed Bishop of Melipilla
 Bishop Juan Barros Madrid (2000.11.21 – 2004.10.09), appointed Bishop of Chile, Military
 Bishop Marco Antonio Órdenes Fernández (43) (Apostolic Administrator 2004.11.17 – 2006.10.23)
 Bishop Marco Antonio Órdenes Fernández (2006.10.23 – 2012.10.09)
 Bishop Guillermo Patricio Vera Soto (2014.02.22 – 2021.06.08), appointed Bishop of Rancagua
 Bishop Isauro Ilises Covili Linfati, O.F.M. (2022.04.23 – ...)

Auxiliary bishop
José del Carmen Valle Gallardo (1963-1966), appointed Bishop here

References

Sources

 GCatholic.org 
 Catholic Hierarchy 
  Diocese website

Roman Catholic dioceses in Chile
Religious organizations established in 1880
Roman Catholic dioceses and prelatures established in the 19th century
Iquique, Roman Catholic Diocese of
1880 establishments in Chile
Iquique